Martijn Spierenburg (born 30 January 1975) is a composer and arranger. He is also keyboard player for the Dutch symphonic rock band Within Temptation. In 2018, it was announced that he would be the composer for the musical "Nieuw Amsterdam", which describes the role of the Dutch during the emergence of the city of New York, back in the Golden Age. This piece will be the successor to the successful Dutch piece "Soldaat van Oranje".

Spierenburg has written and arranged music for several (international) artists, TV series and games. He joined Within Temptation in 2001, shortly after the release of Within Temptation's second full-length studio album, Mother Earth.

Spierenburg co-wrote songs for various Within Temptation albums, including "Angels", "Memories", "Jillian (I'd Give My Heart)", "Our Solemn Hour", "The Cross", "Sinéad" and "Forgiven". He uses ROLAND keyboards on stage.

Spierenburg also writes orchestral arrangements for the band, and oversees the orchestra when the band are recording albums.

References 

1975 births
Dutch keyboardists
Living people
Within Temptation members